Nadowli West was one of the constituencies represented in the Parliament of Ghana. It elects one Member of Parliament (MP) by the first past the post system of election. Nadowli West is located in the Nadowli district  of the Upper West Region of Ghana.

Boundaries
The seat was located within the Nadawli District of the Upper West Region of Ghana. Its western neighbour was la Côte d'Ivoire. To the north was the Jirapa/Lambussie District, to the east the Nadowli East constituency and to the south east the Wa Municipal District and to the south the Wa West District.

History 
The constituency changed in 2004 when the Electoral Commission of Ghana changed the initial Nadowli North to Nadawli West and the Nadwoli South to Nadowli East constituency.

Members of Parliament

Elections

References

See also
List of Ghana Parliament constituencies

Parliamentary constituencies in the Upper West Region